The 1st Lambda Literary Awards were held in 1989 to honour works of LGBT literature published in 1988.

Special awards

Nominees and winners

External links
 1st Lambda Literary Awards

01
Lambda
Lists of LGBT-related award winners and nominees
1989 in LGBT history
1989 awards in the United States